The Chinese Repository was a periodical published in Canton between May 1832 and 1851 to inform Protestant missionaries working in Asia about the history and culture of China, of current events, and documents. The world's first major journal of Sinology, it was the brainchild of Elijah Coleman Bridgman, the first American Protestant missionary appointed to China. Bridgman served as its editor until he left for Shanghai in 1847, but continued to contribute articles. James Granger Bridgman succeeded him as editor, until September 1848, when Samuel Wells Williams took charge.

References

Further reading

External links 
The Chinese Repository, Bibliotheca Sinica, University of Vienna. Includes listing of the volumes available online.

Magazines published in China
Christian magazines
English-language magazines
Defunct magazines published in China
Magazines established in 1832
Magazines disestablished in 1851
Protestant missionaries in China
Sinology